Lü Jihong (born June 27, 1960) is a Chinese singer.

Biography
On 27 June 1960, Lü was born in Tianshui, Gansu Province. He graduated from Xi'an Conservatory of Music in 1982. His teacher was Tao Liling. After graduating, he worked in Lanzhou Normal School as a teacher.

In 1985, Lü transferred to Gansu Song and Dance Troupe and the Chinese People's Liberation Army Naval Song and Dance Troupe in 1989, where he started to learn the arts of music from Jin Tielin.

Discography
 The flower Fragrance
 The Communist Party,I want to say to you
 At This Very Moment
 Port of The Sunset
 Daban City's Nocturne
 In The Eyes of The World
 The Country Is Prosperous And The People Are At Peace
 The Common People
 Mother's Songs
 You Love The Sun Forever
 Northland of Love
 My Chinese Heart,My Love of The Sea

References

Xi'an Conservatory of Music alumni
1960 births
Living people
People from Tianshui
Chinese male singers